Application Level Events (ALE) is a standard created by EPCglobal, an organization of industry leaders devoted to the development of standards for the Electronic Product Code (EPC) and Radio-frequency identification (RFID) technologies and standards. The ALE specification is a software specification indicating required functionality and behavior, as well as a common API expressed through XML Schema Definition (XSD) and Web Services Description Language (WSDL).

External links
Application Level Events (ALE) Standard at GS1 website
RFID Journal - ALE: A New Standard for Data Access

References

Radio-frequency identification
GS1 standards